Daïras of Western Sahara are a subdivision of a wilaya; however, as Morocco is administrating much of  Western Sahara, these are operational only at the Sahrawi refugee camps in Tindouf.

 Wilaya of Auserd: Agüenit, Bir Guenduz, Güera, Mijec, Tichla, and Zug.
 Wilaya of Dakhla: Ain Beida, Argub, Bir Enzaran, Bojador, Glaibat el Fula, Jraifia, and Umdreiga.
 Wilaya of Laayoune: Amgala, Bucraa, Daora, Edchera, Guelta, and Hagunia.
 Wilaya of Smara: Bir Lehlu, Ejdairia, Farsia, Hauza, Mahbes, and Tifariti.

See also 
 Subdivisions of the Sahrawi Arab Democratic Republic

Politics of Western Sahara
Geography of Western Sahara
Administrative divisions in Africa